South Tyneside Council is the local authority of South Tyneside in Tyne and Wear, North East England. It is a metropolitan borough council, one of five in Tyne and Wear and one of 36 in the metropolitan counties of England. It provides the majority of local government services in South Tyneside.

Metropolitan district councils of England
Local authorities in Tyne and Wear
Mayor and cabinet executives
Local education authorities in England
Billing authorities in England
Metropolitan Borough of South Tyneside